The Cook County, Illinois, general elections were held on November 8, 2022. Primaries were be held at an earlier date.

Elections were held for Assessor, Clerk, Sheriff, Treasurer, President of the Cook County Board of Commissioners, all 17 seats of the Cook County Board of Commissioners, all three seats of the Cook County Board of Review, three seats on the Water Reclamation District Board, and for judgeships on the Circuit Court of Cook County.

The Republican Party saw its representation on the Cook County Board of Commissioners reduced from two seats to a single seat. Cook County Commissioner Sean M. Morrison’s victory by a margin of 2.58% marked the only victory in a partisan county race for a Republican nominee, with Democrats winning all other partisan elections.

Election information
2022 was a midterm election year in the United States. The primaries and general elections for Cook County races coincided with those for federal (House and Senate) and those for state elections.

In the primary, turnout among registered voters was 21.14%. Turnout among registered voters in suburban Cook County was 19.61%, with 319,825 ballots cast. Turnout among registered voters in the City of Chicago was 22.81%, with 341,901 ballots cast.

Assessor 

First-term incumbent assessor Fritz Kaegi, a Democrat, was reelected to a second term.

Democratic primary 
In the Democratic primary, the incumbent Kaegi was challenged by Metropolitan Water Reclamation District President Kari Steele.

Polling

Endorsements

Republican nomination 
No candidates ran in the Republican primary.

Libertarian primary 
Nico Tsatsoulis ran uncontested in the Libertarian primary for assessor.

General election

Clerk 

Incumbent clerk is Karen Yarbrough, a Democrat, was reelected to a second term.

Democratic primary 
Yarbrough ran uncontested in the Democratic primary.

Republican nomination
No candidate ran in the Republican primary. The Republican Party ultimately nominated former Cook County Commissioner Tony Peraica.

Libertarian primary 
Joseph Schreiner, an occasional candidate for office and 2020 Illinois House of Representatives Libertarian candidate in District 19, ran uncontested in the Libertarian primary.

Marco Gomez expressed interest, but did not run.

General election

Sheriff 

The incumbent sheriff Tom Dart, a Democrat, was reelected to a fifth term.

Only Democrats have held this office ever since Michael F. Sheahan unseated Republican James E. O'Grady in 1990.

Democratic primary 
Dart was challenged in the Democratic primary by Noland Rivera, Carmen Navarro Gercone, LaTonya Ruffin, and Kirk Ortiz. Only Rivera made the ballot.

Republican nomination
No candidates ran in the Republican Party primary. The Republican Party later nominated Lupe Aguirre.

Libertarian primary 
Cook County Sheriff's Department Deputy Brad Sandefur is ran uncontested in the Libertarian primary after perennial candidate Richard Mayers was disqualified and removed from the ballot. Jack Kozlowski had expressed interest, but did not run.

General election

Treasurer 

Incumbent treasurer  Maria Pappas, a Democrat, was reelected to a seventh term.

Democratic primary 
Pappas ran unchallenged in the Democratic primary.

Republican primary 
No candidates ran in the Republican primary. Republican later nominated Peter Kopsaftis.

Libertarian primary 
Michael Murphy is ran unchallenged in the Libertarian primary.

General election

President of the Cook County Board of Commissioners 

Incumbent president Toni Preckwinkle, a Democrat, was elected to a fourth term.

Democratic primary 
Community activist Zerlina Smith-Members and former Cook County Commissioner Richard Boykin challenged Preckwinkle in the Democratic primary. Only Boykins made the ballot.

Endorsements

Republican primary 
No candidates ran in the Republican primary. Subsequently, Bob Fioretti, who previously ran for the office in the Democratic primary in 2018, was nominated by the Republican Party.

Libertarian primary 
Thea Tsatsos, a 2002 candidate for U.S. House of Representatives in District 1, ran unchallenged in the Libertarian primary. 

Ruben Pantoja considered running, but did not file.

General election

Cook County Board of Commissioners 

The 2022 Cook County Board of Commissioners election saw all seventeen seats of the Cook County Board of Commissioners up for election to four-year terms.

As this was the first elections held following the 2020 United States Census, the seats faced redistricting before this election. A new map was unanimously adopted by the Cook County Board of Commissioners in September 2021.

1st district

Incumbent 1st district commissioner Brandon Johnson, a Democrat, was reelected to a second term.

Democratic primary

Republican primary
No candidate ran in the Republican primary.

Libertarian primary

General election

2nd district

The incumbent 2nd district commissioner is Dennis Deer, a Democrat who was first appointed in 2017, was reelected to a second full term and third overall term.

Democratic primary

Republican primary
No candidate ran in the Republican primary. The Republican Party ultimately nominated Evan Kasal.

General election

3rd district
 
Incumbent 3rd district commissioner Bill Lowry, a Democrat, was reelected to a second term. He was unopposed in both the Democratic primary and general election.

Democratic primary

Republican primary
No candidate ran in the Republican primary.

General election

4th district

The incumbent 4th District commissioner is Stanley Moore, a Democrat, was reelected to a third full (fourth overall) term.

Democratic primary

Republican primary
No candidate ran in the Republican primary. Republicans ultimately nominated Lynn Franco.

General election

5th district

Democrat Monica Gordon was elected to the 5th district seat. The incumbent 5th district commissioner was Deborah Sims, a seventh-term Democrat who did not seek reelection.

Democratic primary
Monica Gordon, a trustee of Prairie State College, won the primary. She was endorsed by retiring incumbent Debora Sims.

Republican primary
No candidate ran in the Republican primary.

Libertarian nomination
The Libertarian Party nominated Jason Decker.

General election

6th district

Incumbent 6th district commissioner Donna Miller, a Democrat, was reelected to a second term.

Democratic primary

Republican primary
No candidate ran in the Republican primary.

Libertarian nomination
The Libertarian Party nominated Anna Biedrzycki.

General election

7th district

Incumbent 7th district commissioner is Alma Anaya, a Democrat, was reelected to a second term. She was unopposed in both the Democratic primary and the general election.

Democratic primary

Republican primary
No candidate ran in the Republican primary.

General election

8th district

Anthony Joel Quezada was elected to the 8th district seat, being unopposed in the general election. Incumbent 8th district commissioner is Luis Arroyo Jr., a second-term Democrat, was defeated for renomination in the Democratic primary by Quezada.

Democratic primary

Republican primary
No candidate ran in the Republican primary.

General election

9th district

Democratic nominee Maggie Trevor won the 9th district seat, flipping the longtime Republican seat to the Democratic Party. Incumbent 9th district commissioner is Peter N. Silvestri, a seventh-term Republican, did not seek reelection.

Democratic primary
Maggie Trevor won the Democratic nomination. Trevor had previously been the unsuccessful Democratic 2018 and 2020 Democratic nominee for the 54th district seat in the Illinois House of Representatives.

Republican primary

General election

10th district

Incumbent 10th district commissioner Bridget Gainer, a Democrat, was reelected to a third full (fourth overall) term.

Democratic primary

Republican primary
No candidates ran in the Republican primary. The Republican Party ultimately nominated Laura Mary Kotelman.

General election

11th district

Incumbent 11th district commissioner John P. Daley, a Democrat, was reelected to a seventh full (eighth overall) term.

Democratic primary

Republican primary

Libertarian primary

General election

12th district

Incumbent 12th district commissioner Bridget Degnen, a Democrat, was reelected to a second term.

Democratic primary

Republican primary
No candidates ran in the Republican primary. Republicans ultimately nominated Alice Hu.

General election

13th district

Democratic nominee Josina Morita was elected to the 13th district seat. Incumbent 13th district commissioner Larry Suffredin, a fifth-term Democrat, did not seek reelection.

Democratic primary

Republican primary
No candidates ran in the Republican primary. Republicans ultimately nominated Andrew Border.

General election

14th district

Incumbent 14th district commissioner is Scott R. Britton, a Democrat, was reelected to a second term.

Democratic primary

Republican primary

General election

15th district

Incumbent 15th district commissioner is Kevin B. Morrison, was reelected to a second term.

Democratic primary

Republican primary

General election

16th district

Incumbent 16th district commissioner is Frank Aguilar, a Democrat who was appointed in 2020, was elected to a full term.

Democratic primary

Republican primary

General election

17th district

Incumbent 17th district commissioner Sean M. Morrison, a Republican, was reelected to a second full (third overall) term. He was the only Republican nominee to win any Cook County partisan elections in 2022.

Democratic primary

Republican primary

General election

Cook County Board of Review

In the 2022 Cook County Board of Review election, all three seats, all of which are Democratic-held, will be up for reelection.

The Cook County Board of Review has its three seats rotate the length of terms. In a staggered fashion (in which no two seats have coinciding two-year terms), the seats rotate between two consecutive four-year terms and a two-year term. This will be the first year since 2012 that all three seats are coincidingly up for election.

The seats will face redistricting before this election.

1st district

Democratic nominee George Cardenas, a Chicago alderman, won the general election without an opponent. First-term Commissioner Tammy Wendt, a Democrat first elected in 2020, had beemn defeated for renomination by Cardenas. This election was for a four-year term.

Democratic primary
Candidates
George Cardenas Chicago Alderman, 12th ward, 2003–present
Tammy Wendt, incumbent commissioner of the Board of Review

Results

Republican primary
No candidates ran in the Republican primary.

General election

2nd district

Democratic nominee Samantha Steele won election to the 2nd district seat. Incumbent second-term Commissioner Michael Cabonargi, a Democrat, was defeated for renomination by Steele in the Democratic primary. This election was for a four-year term.

Democratic primary

Republican primary
No candidates ran in the Republican primary.

General election

3rd district

Incumbent commissioner Larry Rogers, Jr., a Democrat, was reelected to a sixth term. He was unopposed in both the Democratic primary and the general election. This election was for a two-year term.

Democratic primary

Republican primary
No candidates ran in the Republican primary.

General election

Water Reclamation District Board 

In the 2022 Metropolitan Water Reclamation District of Greater Chicago election, three six-year term seats were up for a regularly-scheduled election and an additional seat was upon for election to a partial term in a special election.

Regular election
Three seats were with six-year terms were up for election in the regular election, with voters able to vote for up to three candidates. In both the primaries and general election, the top-three finishers were the winners. 

Incumbent Democrat Mariyana T. Spyropoulos was reelected alongside New Democratic members Yumeka Brown and Patricia Theresa Flynn. Incumbent Democrats Josina Morita and Barbara McGowan did not seek reelection.

Democratic primary
Incumbent Mariana T. Spyropoulos was renominated. Among the unsuccessful candidates was former commissioner Rick Avila.

Republican primary
Only one candidate, R. Cary Capparelli, ran in the Republican primary.

Green nomination
The Green Party nominated only one candidate, Mark E. Buettner.

General election

Special election
A seat with a partial unexpired term was up for election. Incumbent Perry D. Chakena, who had been appointed to fill the vacancy, unsuccessfully sought the Democratic Party nomination to finish the partial term that she had been appointed to.

Democratic primary

Republican nomination
No candidate ran in the Republican primary

Green nomination
The Green Party nominated Toneal M. Jackson.

Circuit Court of Cook County 
Judicial elections to the Circuit Court of Cook County were also held. All 61 justices up for retention elections were retained. There were 29 partisan elections to fill judicial vacancies. Democratic nominees won all of these, with only one judicial race having a competitive general election (featuring a Republican Party opponent).

Other elections
Coinciding with the primaries, elections were held to elect both the Democratic and Republican committeepeople for the suburban townships.

See also 
 2022 Illinois elections

Notes

References 

Cook County
2022
Cook County
Cook County 2022